Kilnsey is a small village in Wharfedale, North Yorkshire, England. It lies on the B6160 road, between the villages of Grassington and Kettlewell, near Arncliffe and just across the River Wharfe from Conistone.

History
The village is mentioned in the Domesday Book as Chilsie when it was described as waste. Soon after the Domesday Book had been completed, the lands in and around Kilnsey were given to Edulf de Culnese. The derivation of the name is believed to come from Kyle and Ea, which means the chilly stream.

The most notable feature of Kilnsey is a large limestone cliff called Kilnsey Crag, overlooking the road and the River Wharfe from the west. The crag is around 170 feet high, with an overhang of 40 feet. It was painted by J. M. W. Turner in 1816.  The crag contains several of Britain's most extreme sport climbing routes, such as Northern Lights , and North Star , by Steve McClure.

West from Kilnsey towards Malham Tarn runs the historic Mastiles Lane, a Roman marching road, later an important route for monks leading sheep from Fountains Abbey to summer pasture on higher ground. This is now a Dales walking track.

The village of Kilnsey is a small collection of stone-built Yorkshire Dales cottages, many dating back to the 1600s. The Old Hall in the village is believed to have been a medieval administrative site for the monks of Fountains Abbey who farmed flocks of sheep in the area. Most of the present building dates from 1648.

Kilnsey Park is a visitor attraction and fishing lake that was established in 1978 by the Roberts family. The park offers attractions including fishing, a nature trail and farm animals. There is also a working fish farm, smokehouse, and cafe.

Kilnsey has one pub, the Tennant Arms, named after the Tennant family of Chapel House (on the site of an ancient chapel belonging to Kilnsey Grange, a possession of Fountains Abbey) which owned the Kilnsey Estate from 1572 to 1911.

Each autumn the village hosts Kilnsey Show, one of the largest one-day agricultural shows in the country. The show was officially established in 1897 and regularly attracts over 12,000 visitors, though records dating back to the mid-1800s tell of harness racing and the fell race having been run for most of that century. The timing of the show has been linked as possibly tying in with the saint's day for St Mary's Church in nearby Conistone.

On 5 July 2014, the Tour de France Stage 1 from Leeds to Harrogate passed through the village.

Old Nan
Old Nan was allegedly a witch living under Kilnsey Crag and well known locally. She was known as far as Skipton, where she had a stand in the market.

Gallery

References

Sources

External links

Mastiles Lane and Malham Tarn Walk
Kilnsey Old Hall
Tennant Arms
Kilnsey Park trout farm
Kilnsey show
 Kilnsey show images

Villages in North Yorkshire
Wharfedale
Climbing areas of England